Mount Capanne is the highest mountain on the Italian island of Elba and in the province of Livorno, Tuscany, Italy.

Features
The mountain is part of the Arcipelago Toscano National Park.

The Monte Capanne summit can be reached in 14 minutes via cable car, which departs from Marciana.The mountain has Matorral shrublands and woodlands vegetation habitats, of the Mediterranean forests, woodlands, and scrub biome.

See also
Tuscan Archipelago

References

External links

Elba
Capanne
Arcipelago Toscano National Park